Kishanbhai Vestabhai Patel (born 2 June 1964) was a member during 14th & 15th Lok Sabha of India. He represented the Valsad constituency from Gujarat state and is a member of the Indian National Congress.

External links
 Official biographical sketch in Parliament of India website

1964 births
Living people
People from Valsad district
Indian National Congress politicians from Gujarat
India MPs 2004–2009
India MPs 2009–2014
Lok Sabha members from Gujarat